The Cassville Shales is a geologic formation in West Virginia. It preserves fossils dating back to the Permian period.

See also

 List of fossiliferous stratigraphic units in West Virginia

References
 

Permian West Virginia
Permian geology of Virginia